Acteniopsis is a genus of snout moths in the subfamily Pyralinae. It was described by Hans Georg Amsel in 1959 and is known from the United Arab Emirates.

Species
 Acteniopsis kurdistanella Amsel, 1959
 Acteniopsis gambronensis Alipanah & Asselbergs, 2018

Former species
 Acteniopsis robustus, now Stemmatophora robustus (Asselbergs, 2010)

References

Pyralinae
Pyralidae genera
Taxa named by Hans Georg Amsel